Rup or RUP may refer to:

 Aromanian language (ISO-639: rup)
 Rational Unified Process, a software development process framework
 Restricted use pesticide, pesticides not available to the general public in the US
 Rup dialects of the Bulgarian language
 Rup Magon, Canadian musician
 Rupsi Airport, near Dhubi, Assam, India
 Rural–urban proportional representation, a proposed voting system developed in Canada

Political parties 
 Raza Unida Party, a former U.S. political party
 Revolutionary Ukrainian Party
 Rural and Urban Political Party, a political party in Solomon Islands

University presses 
 Rice University Press
 Rockefeller University Press
 Rutgers University Press